Otto IV, Prince of Anhalt-Bernburg (died 1 May 1415) was a German prince of the House of Ascania and ruler of the principality of Anhalt-Bernburg.

He was the youngest son of Otto III, Prince of Anhalt-Bernburg, by his unknown first wife.

Life
Otto succeeded his father (bypassing his older brother Bernhard) when he died in 1404, but was obliged to rule jointly with his cousin Bernhard V, son of Henry IV.

He died unmarried and childless and was succeeded by his cousin and co-ruler Bernhard V. Otto's older brother Bernhard VI could only take possession of Bernburg five years later, in 1420, after the death of Bernhard V.

Princes of Anhalt-Bernburg
1415 deaths
Year of birth unknown